The Chennai Central–Nagercoil Superfast Express is a Superfast train belonging to Southern Railway zone that runs between  and  in India. It is currently being operated with 12689/12690 train numbers on a weekly basis.

Service

The 12689/Chennai Central Nagercoil Superfast Express has an average speed of 55 km/h and covers 923 km in 16h 45m. The 12690/Nagercoil–Chennai Central Superfast Express has an average speed of 55 km/hr and covers 923 km in 16h 45m.

Route and halts 

The important halts of the train are:

 
 
 Katpadi Junction
 Jolarpettai Junction

Coach composition

The train has standard ICF rakes with max speed of 110 km/h. The train consists of 14 coaches:

 1 AC 1st class
 2 AC III Tier
 9 Sleeper coaches
 6 General Unreserved
 2 Seating cum Luggage Rake

Traction

Both trains are hauled by a Royapuram Loco Shed-based WAP-7 or WAP-4 electric locomotive from Chennai to Salem. From Salem, train is hauled by an Erode Loco Shed-based WDM-3A diesel locomotive.

See also 

 Chennai Egmore railway station
 Nagercoil Junction railway station
 Chennai Egmore–Kanniyakumari Superfast Express
 Chennai Egmore–Nagercoil Weekly Superfast Express
 Tambaram–Nagercoil Superfast Express
 Island Express

Notes

References

External links 

 12689/Chennai Central–Nagercoil (Weekly) SF Express India Rail Info
 12690/Nagercoil–Chennai Central (Weekly) SF Express India Rail Info

Transport in Chennai
Transport in Nagercoil
Express trains in India
Rail transport in Tamil Nadu